Staroaktashevo (İśke Aqtaş) is a rural locality (a village) in Sakhayevsky Selsoviet, Karmaskalinsky District, Bashkortostan, Russia. The population was 414 as of 2010. There are 11 streets.

Geography 
Staroaktashevo is located 23 km northeast of Karmaskaly (the district's administrative centre) by road. Staroshareyevo is the nearest rural locality.

References 

Rural localities in Karmaskalinsky District